Hembree is an indie rock band from Kansas City, Missouri. Hembree consists of Isaac Flynn, Garrett Childers, Eric Davis, Alex Ward, and Austin Ward. The band began releasing songs independently in 2015. Hembree is signed to Thirty Tigers of Nashville, TN. Their debut studio album, House on Fire, was released in April 2019.

History 
The band was founded by original members Isaac Flynn, Garrett Childers, and Eric Davis. Brothers Alex and Austin Ward later joined in 2018.

Hembree quickly garnered national attention after their single "Holy Water" was placed in an Apple commercial that aired during Super Bowl LII. The band's music has been featured in a variety of other national placements, including Monday Night Football (NFL) and Bose.

Hembree has notably supported Elvis Costello, Phoenix, Cold War Kids, Vance Joy, JR JR, and Joywave, among others. The band first toured Europe in Fall 2018.

In 2018, Hembree signed with Thirty Tigers (The Avett Brothers, Lupe Fiasco) to release their first full-length album House on Fire, released 4/26/2019.

In 2019, Hembree performed at  Hangout Music Festival in May and Music Midtown in September. During June 2019, they were featured on Alt Nation's Advanced Placement Tour alongside bands Bloxx and Warbly Jets. In October 2019, they supported Mating Ritual. In December 2019, they supported The Get Up Kids for 11 shows. 

They also appear on the soundtrack of Netflix's 13 Reasons Why: Season 3 with the song "Culture", and Outer Banks with the song "Continents".

Media appearances 
Hembree was named one of NPR's Slingshot 2018 Artists to Watch.

Rolling Stone named Hembree as one of the thirty best artists at SXSW 2018.

"Had It All" debuted on Zane Lowe's Beats 1 on January 19, 2017. Lowe described the song as "absolutely fantastic."

"Holy Water" was featured in Apple's HomePod "Distortion" TV spot, which ran during Super Bowl LII, the 60th Annual Grammy Awards, and the 2018 Winter Olympics.

"Continents" (single) was featured on Kitsuné America 5: The NBA Edition.

Members 
Isaac Flynn - guitar, lead vocals (2015-present)

Garrett Childers - bass, vocals (2015-present)

Eric Davis - keys, synth (2015-present)

Alex Ward - guitar (2018-present)

Austin Ward - drums (2018-present)

Discography

References

External links 
 
 

Indie rock musical groups from Missouri
Musical groups from Kansas City, Missouri
Thirty Tigers artists